Future is the third studio album by Los Angeles rock band the Seeds. The album is a notable shift in musical direction for the band as they moved away from garage rock, and began experimenting more with psychedelic rock. Upon its release in 1967, the album reached the Top 100 on the Billboard 200, but their single, "A Thousand Shadows", was less successful than The Seeds' previous hits.

Background

The Seeds moved into 1967 as an established band with national hits, including "Pushin' Too Hard", and two albums solidifying their individual sound. With their new manager, Lord Tim Hudson, and a knack for outlandish live performances, the band's public profile was at an all-time high. The band went into recording sessions hoping to capitalize on their past success, and create a more sophisticated sound.

Recording sessions began in Gold Star Studios as early as November 3, 1966, but the majority of studio work was completed in 1967. The first recorded track, "Travel With Your Mind", was the only one complete in 1966, and was a contrast to the future developments. The project was complete on June 6, 1967 with the final track being "March of the Flower Children". The Seeds, mostly under the direction of Sky Saxon utilized orchestrations, and classical instruments in a psychedelic format. Compared to past material, the band established a complexity in their instrumentals as there were more overdubbing involved in the process. Each individual song took an obviously increased amount of takes to find cohesion with the overdubbing. Saxon had embraced the psychedelic scene in the band's own take on the genre, and infused it with their own sound. New instruments more prominent in Future recordings including the piano, trumpet, and percussion.

Release

Future was released in August 1967 on the GNP label, and reached moderate chart success when it peaked at number 87 on the Billboard 200. The band's lead single, "A Thousand Shadows", fared better than the group's last single, "Mr. Farmer", but still only reached number 72 on the Billboard Hot 100. Future was the last Seeds album to chart nationally, and, despite its success, has been unfavored by some. Critics directed their disappointment at the album's similarities to The Beatles' work, Sgt. Pepper's Lonely Hearts Club Band, even though The Seeds began recording before that album could potentially influence their work. In 2013, Future was re-released on the Big Beats label featuring outtakes, alternate versions, and extensive liner notes by Alec Palao.

Track listing

 "Introduction"/"March of the Flower Children" - [two separate tracks on some CDs] (Saxon, Hooper)
 "Travel with Your Mind" (Saxon, Hooper, Savage)
 "Out of the Question" (Saxon, Serpent)
 "Painted Doll" (Saxon)
 "Flower Lady and Her Assistant" (Saxon)
 "Now a Man" (Saxon, Hooper, Savage)
 "A Thousand Shadows" (Saxon, Hooper, Savage)
 "Two Fingers Pointin' on You" (Saxon)
 "Where Is the Entrance Way to Play" (Saxon)
 "Six Dreams" (Saxon)
 "Fallin'" (Saxon, Hooper)

2013 bonus tracks

Disc One: mono mixes
 "Chocolate River" - [mono]
 "Sad and Alone" - [mono]
 "The Wind Blows Your Hair" (version 2) - [mono]
 "Travel with Your Mind" - [mono]
 "Painted Doll" - [mono]
 "Flower Lady and Her Assistant" - [mono]
 "Now a Man" - [mono]
 "Two Fingers Pointing on You" - [mono]
 "Where Is the Entrance Way to Play" - [mono]
 "Six Dreams" (alternate mix) - [mono]
 "Fallin'" - [mono]
"The Navy Swings" - [mono]

Disc Two: Contact High — Outtakes from the Future Sessions
 "Rides Too Long"
 "Chocolate River"
 "Flower Lady and Her Assistant" (take 1)
 "Where Is the Entrance Way to Play" (alternate mix)
 "Sad and Alone"
 "Contact High" (take 1)
 "Travel With Your Mind" (alternate mix)
 "Six Dreams" (take 4)
 "Two Fingers Pointing on You" (take 1)
 "The Wind Blows Your Hair" (version 2)
 "March of the Flower Children" (alternate mix)
 "A Thousand Shadows" (take 7)
 "Gypsy Plays His Drums" (version 1) 
 "Satisfy You" (version 1)
 "900 Million People Daily All Making Love" (full length version)

Personnel

 Sky Saxon - lead vocals, bass guitar, cover, artwork
 Jan Savage - lead guitar, gong, backing vocals
 Harvey Sharpe - bass guitar
 Daryl Hooper - organ, sitar, piano, backing vocals
 Rick Andridge - drums, backing vocals
 Doc Siegel - engineer

References

1967 albums
The Seeds albums
GNP Crescendo Records albums